David Richardson (born 25 March 1948) is a Canadian bobsledder. He competed in the four man event at the 1972 Winter Olympics.

References

1948 births
Living people
Canadian male bobsledders
Olympic bobsledders of Canada
Bobsledders at the 1972 Winter Olympics
Sportspeople from Montreal